Pirmahal is a tehsil in Toba Tek Singh District, Punjab, Pakistan. The capital is Pir Mahal. Government of Punjab, Pakistan issue notification of Pir Mahal Tehsil on 24 January 2013, with effect from 1 February 2013. 
before this Pir Mahal was a sub-tehsil of Kamalia Tehsil of Punjab, Pakistan. Pir Mahal Tehsil consist four small towns and according to the notification of Government of Punjab, Pakistan, Pirmahal Tehsil has 16 Union councils consisting of 133 Revenue Estates (small towns and villages).

References

Populated places in Punjab, Pakistan
Tehsils of Punjab, Pakistan